The 2016–17 Fulham season is the club's 119th professional season and third consecutive in the EFL Championship after the club's relegation from the Premier League in 2013–14. The club will also compete in the EFL Cup and the FA Cup. Fulham mathematically secured a place in the 2016–17 EFL Championship play-offs by beating fellow promotion hopefuls Sheffield Wednesday 2–1 away from home on 7 May 2017.

Transfers

In

Loans in

Out

Loans out

Pre-season

Friendlies

Competitions

EFL Championship

Overall

League table

Results summary

Matches
The fixture list was released on 22 June 2016, with Fulham playing their first match at home to Newcastle United live on Sky Sports.

Results by matchday

Play-offs

EFL Cup

The same day the Championship fixture list was released, the draw for the first round of the EFL Cup took place; Fulham were drawn away to Leyton Orient. In the next round they were drawn at home to Middlesbrough.

FA Cup

Squad statistics

Appearances and goals

Last updated 13 May 2017.

Players listed with no appearances have been in the matchday squad but only as unused substitutes.

|-
|colspan="12" style="text-align:center;" |Out on loan
|-

|-
|colspan="12" style="text-align:center;" |Left during season
|-

Top scorers
Includes all competitive matches. The list is sorted by squad number when total goals are equal.

Last updated 13 May 2017.

Disciplinary record
Includes all competitive matches. The list is sorted by position, and then shirt number.

|-
|colspan=17 style="text-align:center;" |Out on loan
|-

|-
|colspan=17 style="text-align:center;" |Left during season
|-

|-
|colspan=4|TOTALS
|80
|1
|3
|5
|0
|0
|3
|0
|0
|88
|1
|3
|

Suspensions

References

Fulham F.C. seasons
Fulham Fc Season, 2016-17
Fulham